Emal Pasarly is the multimedia editor for the BBC Pashto-Persian service and regularly contributes to BBC World News.

Personal life
Emal Pasarly was born in the northern province of Kunduz, Afghanistan, to an upper-middle-class family. As a result of the Russian invasion of Afghanistan, his family migrated to neighboring Pakistan. He moved to London in 1993 and began working with the BBC World Service in 1996. He is the son of a well-known Afghan poet Mohammad Seddiq Pasarly, and the brother of classic writer Asadullah Ghazanfar, journalists Esmat Sarwan, Ajmal Pasarly and Nazo Pasarly (now Nazo Essa). He married his wife Fareba in 2003 in London and has two children.

Journalism
Pasarly has been working for the BBC for almost 20 years. He has interviewed a number of well known Afghan and international politicians and opposition figures including David Miliband, a former British Labour Party politician who was the Member of Parliament for South Shields from 2001 to 2013, and was the Secretary of State for Foreign and Commonwealth Affairs from 2007 to 2010. His other notable interviews were with Mullah Omar, the leader of the Afghan Taliban movement who controlled Afghanistan from 1994 to 2001 before they were driven out by American and allied forces. Pasarly has interviewed the secretive one-eyed leader Mullah Omar three times by phone in four- or five-minute conversations that were recorded on the spot without prior arrangement. The last such conversation took place late in 2001, after US B-52 bombers had started pounding Taliban-controlled areas. Pasarly later told an Aljazeera reporter about his experience of interviewing Mullah Omar. "The impression I was left with is that he either does not understand the nuances of issues, or that he is too smart and does not want to give clues on his inner thoughts".

Writing
Pasarly also writes fiction in Pashto; he is the author of several books including three novels, 11 collections of short stories, a collection of plays and 6 non-fiction book about online journalism including the  History of Afghan cricket. Before joining the BBC Pasarly was the editor of a monthly magazine called DEWA, for Pashto literature in London.

References

External links
 BBC Blog.
 Asian Cricket council
 Afghan literature site which has Emal's bio
  Emal Pasarly speaks at London's Frontline Club,2013
  Aljazeera quotes Pasarly on Mullah Omar
 
 British Afghan women society mentions Emal Pasarly’s experience on Bilingualism  
 Head of council for Helmand's tribal elders tells BBC Pashto's Emal Pasarly about the frustrations of local residents.
 Emal Pasarly on Afghanistan YouTube ban 
 Pasarly on Mullah Omar
 Pasarly discuses Afghan corruption case
 Pasarly talks about Honour killing in Afghanistan 
 Journalist profile 
https://www.theguardian.com/sport/2019/may/19/afghanistan-cricket-world-cup-guide-game-plan-key-player-and-prediction

1974 births
Living people
Afghan journalists
Afghan television journalists
Afghan television presenters
BBC newsreaders and journalists
Afghan emigrants to England
Afghan expatriates in Pakistan
People from Kunduz Province